Jason Dean Hall (born April 28, 1972) is an American screenwriter, film director, and former actor. He played the recurring character of Devon MacLeish in Buffy the Vampire Slayer. He had a guest starring role on Without a Trace as Jesse in season two.

As a screenwriter, Hall co-wrote Paranoia (with Barry Levy), Spread (2009 film) and the screenplay for American Sniper, for which he received an Academy Award nomination for Best Adapted Screenplay.

Early life
Hall attended Phillips Exeter Academy. He studied business, English, and cinema at the University of Southern California.

Filmography

References

External links
 

1972 births
American male screenwriters
American male television actors
Film directors from California
Living people
Male actors from California
People from Lake Arrowhead, California
University of Southern California alumni
Phillips Exeter Academy alumni
Screenwriters from California